is one of seven wards of Hamamatsu, Shizuoka, Japan, located in the south of the city. It is bordered by Naka-ku, Higashi-ku, Nishi-ku, and the city of Iwata and Pacific Ocean. It has the fifth largest area and the fourth largest population of the seven wards of Hamamatsu. Much of Minami-ku is still rural, with farms and rice fields.

Minami-ku was created on April 1, 2007, when Hamamatsu became a city designated by government ordinance (a "designated city"). 

Minami-ku is served by Takatsuka Station on the Tōkaidō Main Line railway.  

Suzuki has its headquarters in Minami-ku.

References

Wards of Hamamatsu